The Martin-Baker Mk.7 is a British rocket-assisted ejection seat designed and built by Martin-Baker. Introduced in the mid-1960s, the Mk.7 has been installed in combat aircraft worldwide.

History
The Mk.7 seat was developed from the earlier Mk.5 design by the addition of a rocket pack to enable zero-zero capability. A large upgrade program to retrofit Mk.7 seats to all Lockheed F-104 Starfighter aircraft in German Air Force service was initiated by Johannes Steinhoff in late 1967, this measure improved the type's safety record and several other European nations operating the Starfighter followed Germany's lead.

Operation sequence
Operating either the seat pan or face blind firing handles initiates aircraft canopy jettison, as the canopy clears an interlock is removed which allows the main gun located at the rear of the seat to fire, the main gun is a telescopic tube with two explosive charges that fire in sequence. As the seat moves up its guide rails an emergency oxygen supply is activated and personal equipment tubing and communication leads are automatically disconnected, leg restraints also operate.

As the seat moves further up and out of the aircraft the rocket pack is fired by a lanyard attached to the cockpit floor. A steel rod, known as the drogue gun, is fired and extracts two small parachutes to stabilise the seat's descent path. A barostatic mechanism prevents the main parachute from opening above an altitude of 10,000 ft (3,000 m) A time delay mechanism operates the main parachute below this altitude in conjunction with another device to prevent the parachute opening at high speed. The seat then separates from the occupant for a normal parachute descent, a manual separation handle is provided should the automatic system fail.

Applications
The Mk.7 ejection seat has been installed in the following aircraft types, either as original equipment or by modification:
List from Martin-Baker.
EWR VJ 101 
Grumman A-6 Intruder
Grumman F-9 Cougar
Grumman F-14 Tomcat
Lockheed F-104 Starfighter
McDonnell Douglas F-4 Phantom II
Northrop F-5
Northrop Grumman EA-6B Prowler
Vought F-8 Crusader

Seats on display
A Martin-Baker Mk.7A is on static display at the Royal Air Force Museum London with another Mk.7A at the Royal Air Force Museum Cosford.

Specifications (Mk.7)
Maximum operating height: 50,000 ft (15,240 m)
Minimum operating height: Ground level
Minimum operating speed: Zero
Maximum operating speed: 600 knots indicated airspeed

References

Footnotes

Citations

Bibliography

 Kropf, Klaus. German Starfighters. Hinckley, Leicestershire, UK: Midland Counties Publications, 2002. .

Martin-Baker ejection seats